Slobodan Antić (Serbian Cyrillic: Слободан Антић; born 13 November 1950) is a Yugoslav former professional footballer who played as a midfielder.

Honours
Radnički Niš
 Balkans Cup: 1975

References

External links
 

AS Nancy Lorraine players
Association football midfielders
Expatriate footballers in France
FK Radnički Niš players
Ligue 1 players
Ligue 2 players
Olympique de Marseille players
Serbian footballers
Sportspeople from Niš
Yugoslav expatriate footballers
Yugoslav expatriates in France
Yugoslav First League players
Yugoslav footballers
1950 births
Living people